Nashla Bogaert Rosario (born 11 May 1986) is a Dominican actress and TV presenter.

Career
In 2004, Nashla Bogaert started her career in the Dominican television on the sabbatine variety show "Divertido con Jochy". She quit in 2012.

In 2018, Bogaert became co-producer of Dominicana's Got Talent, the Dominican Republic spin-off of Simon Cowell's Got Talent international talent show. She will co-produce it with “Tuto” Guerrero, Gilberto Morillo and her husband David Maler. Its first season will air from September to December 2019 on Color Visión.

Filmography

Personal life
Nashla Bogaert Rosario was born on 11 May 1986 in San Francisco de Macorís. She is the daughter of Alberto Bogaert and Carmen Rosario Hazim. Her paternal grandfather was Alberto Aquilino Manuel Bogaert Román, the fourth child of Libert Louis Bogaert (1866–1935), a Belgian engineer of Flemish origin who migrated to the Dominican Republic in the late 1800s and established in El Cibao region and married Dolores de Jesús Román Grullón (double cousin-twice removed of Juan Isidro Jimenes Grullón, second cousin of Arturo Grullón, and second cousin-twice removed of Alejandro Grullón). Libert Bogaert also served as Consul of Belgium.

In August 2013, Bogaert married Argentine-Dominican actor, film director and musician David Maler, son of the Argentine artist .

References 

Living people
1986 births
Dominican Republic people of Flemish descent
Dominican Republic people of French descent
Dominican Republic television presenters
Dominican Republic film actresses
People from San Francisco de Macorís
Dominican Republic stage actresses
Dominican Republic women television presenters